Siti Badriah (born 11 November 1986), also known by her alias Sibad, is an Indonesian singer, songwriter, actress, and dancer. She became well known internationally in 2018 due to the popularity of her song Lagi Syantik, which has since gained over 500 million views on the popular streaming site YouTube.

Siti won "Best Contemporary Dangdut Female Solo Artist" three years in a row at the Indonesian Music Awards in 2017, 2018 and 2019. In 2018, she won the "Best ASEAN Economic Community Song" award at the Look Tung Mahanakorn Awards.

Career
Siti Badriah began singing in her early childhood, beginning in grade 2 in elementary school. Throughout her childhood, she would travel with her father's dangdut orchestra and perform with well-known singers and participate in various music festivals. Though her will of becoming a singer was not her original intention, having wanting to become a dentist since an early age. In a 2018 interview, Siti admitted that she still wanted to be a dentist, and that being a singer was not a priority.

In 2011, she was approached by songwriter Endang Raes to perform the song "Samu Samu Selingkuh". The collaboration spurred their collaborative song "Melanggar Hukum" (Breaking the Law), which was presented to Rahayu Kertawiguna, the founder of the Nagaswara music label. Both songs were released less than a week apart.

On 16 March 2018, Siti released the single "Lagi Syantik". The song was an immediate success, garnering over 160 million views on the streaming site YouTube within the first three months. Due to its success, Siti gained international recognition, causing the single to chart at No. 12 on the international Billboard charts. At the time, Siti and South Korean group Blackpink were the only Asian artists charting on Billboard. The song also became popular in Thailand, where Siti won the "Best ASEAN Economic Community Song" award at the 2018 Look Tung Mahanakorn Awards.

Later that year, she collaborated with RPH & DJ Donall for the songs "Lagi Tamvan" (6 June) and "Sandiwaramu Luar Biasa" (17 October). She collaborated with RPH again in 2019 for the song "Nikah Sama Kamu", which also became a viral success, garnering over 1.4 million views on YouTube since its release.

2020 continued to bring the artist success with the release of her songs "Pipi Mimi" and "Video Call Aku". The release date of "Pipi Mimi" - 13 February - coincided with other NAGASWARA artists, including Baby Sexyola, Fitri Carlina and Bebizy, among others. On the music chart ranking site Popnable, the song peaked at No. 2. "Video Call Aku" failed to garner similar reactions, charting in the top 40.

Personal life
Siti married Krisjiana Baharudin on 25 July 2019 in Siti's hometown of Bekasi, West Java. The couple had a daughter named Xarena Zenata Denallie Baharudin (b. 18 March 2022).

Discography

Studio albums
2014: Satu Sama
2014: Satu Sama <VCD version>
2018: Lagi Syantik

Compilation albums
2014: Hot Single Dangdut vol.2
2014: Hot Single Dangdut vol.3
2016: The Best of Dangdut

Singles

2012: Brondong Tua
2012: Suamiku Kawin Lagi
2014: Satu Sama
2014: Andilau
2014: Heboh Janger
2014: Keenakan
2014: Selimut Malam 
2014: Jakarta Hongkong
2014.06.08: Sama Sama Selingkuh feat. Endang Raes
2014.06.18: Melanggar Hukum 
2014.11.09: Bara Bere 
2015.06.08: Sama Sama
2016.08.08: Mama Minta Pulsa
2016.05.26: Senandung Cinta 

2016.05.29: Hilang Semua Janji <OST. Senandung>
2017.03.01: Harapan Cinta
2017.05.05: Ketemu Mantan
2017.08.07: Undangan Mantan 
2018.01.03: Nasib Orang Miskin
2018.01.05: Aku Kudu Kuat feat. RPH <OST. Dendang Cinta Wulan>
2018.01.16: Bojoku feat. Mahesa Ofki & Temon #PawangKuota
2018.03.16: Lagi Syantik
2018.10.17: Harus Rindu Siapa
2018.10.17: Sandiwaramu Luar Biasa feat. RPH & DJ Donall
2019.03.22: Nikah Sama Kamu feat. RPH
2020.02.13: Pipi Mimi 
2020.07.15: Video Call Aku

Songs as featured artist
"Cinta Tak Harus Memilik" (with Siti Badriah)
 Delon / Release Date: 19 January 2017
"Tobat Maksiat" feat. Siti Badriah
 Zaskia Gotik / Release Date: 24 May 2017
"Lagi Tamvan" feat. Siti Badriah
 RPH & DJ Donall / Release Date: 6 June 2018

Awards and nominations 
Indonesia

Overseas

References

External links
Official Site

1986 births
Living people
21st-century Indonesian women singers
Indonesian dangdut singers
Indonesian pop singers
Indonesian film actresses
Indonesian television actresses
Actresses from West Java
Musicians from West Java
People from Bekasi